Steven Williams (born January 7, 1949) is an American actor in films and television. He is known for his roles as Captain Adam Fuller on 21 Jump Street, Lt. Jefferson Burnett on The Equalizer, Det. August Brooks on L.A. Heat, X on The X-Files,  Russell "Linc" Lincoln in Linc's, and Rufus Turner in Supernatural.

Throughout his career, Williams has appeared in numerous films, including The Blues Brothers (1980), Twilight Zone: The Movie (1983), Jason Goes to Hell: The Final Friday (1993), 22 Jump Street (2014), It (2017), and Birds of Prey (2020).

He has been nominated for a Screen Actors Guild Award and one NAACP Image Award.

Early life
Williams was born in Memphis, Tennessee, and was predominantly reared in Chicago. His parents were divorced, and he was raised at separate times by his father in Michigan, his mother in Chicago and by his maternal grandparents in Millington, Tennessee. In Chicago, he attended Wendell Phillips High School. After graduating, he matriculated at the General Motors Institute, an automaker's engineering school. Williams later worked as a postal carrier, salesman, and model.

He was drafted into the United States Army, serving in the 2nd Armored Division, stationed in Gelnhausen, Germany and became Divisional Champion with the United States Army Boxing Team, Middleweight Division. Upon receiving an Honorable Discharge from the United States Army, Williams worked for the United States Postal Service as a mailman. After delivering the mail in subzero temperatures, he went to work in Chicago's garment district as an apparel salesman.

Career
Williams made his acting debut in the 1975 film Cooley High. He appeared in musical comedy The Blues Brothers (1980) as Trooper Mount, and played Lt. Jefferson Burnett on the CBS drama series The Equalizer in 1985. He portrayed renegade Capt. David Nester in the 1985 film Missing in Action 2: The Beginning,

He landed the role of Captain Adam Fuller, a senior police officer supervising younger cops, on Fox Network's TV series 21 Jump Street in 1987. Williams replaced Frederic Forrest, who played a similar character, early in the series. He continued playing the character until the series ended in 1991. While acting in the series, Williams played Lieutenant Gallagher in Under the Gun (1988), which featured Vanessa Williams in the cast.

Following his stint on 21 Jump Street, Williams portrayed the title character in The 100 Lives of Black Jack Savage. He played the role of Det. August Brooks on the TNT series L.A. Heat in 1996. He recurred as X on the Fox hit science fiction series The X-Files. He earned a Screen Actors Guild nomination for Outstanding Performance by an Ensemble in a Drama Series in 1997 for his work as X.

Williams appeared as main character Russell "Linc" Lincoln, a bartender, in comedy Linc's. In 2000, he received an NAACP Image Award nomination, in the category of Outstanding Actor in a Comedy Series. Concurrently, Williams portrayed Isaac in short-lived UPN series Legacy.

He portrayed Rufus Turner in fantasy series Supernatural (2008−16), and was Quentin in drama The Chi (2018−present). Williams' work on the latter has been well received, with reviewers finding him "strong" and "powerful" as Quentin. Williams garnered several recurring roles in the 2010s and 2020s, including attorney Stephen Carlisle in Ambitions (2019) and teacher Joe Ridgeway in Locke & Key (2020), both dramas.

Williams has appeared extensively in guest roles on television. He portrayed an Army friend of the protagonist in MacGyver, and was Robin Dumars' father on Hangin' with Mr. Cooper. Other guest appearances include The Dukes of Hazzard, The A-Team, Booker,  Stargate SG-1, Martin, Veronica Mars, The Bernie Mac Show, Criminal Minds and iZombie.

Other film roles include a bar patron in Twilight Zone: The Movie (1983), bounty hunter Creighton Duke in horror film Jason Goes to Hell: The Final Friday (1993) and Carlos in Adventures of Power (2009). In TV movies, Williams was a Panamanian boat captain named Mo in Dreams of Gold: The Mel Fisher Story (1986) and portrayed pitcher Satchel Paige in The Court-Martial of Jackie Robinson (1990).

Personal life
His wife is talent agent Ann Geddes, and the couple have two daughters.

Filmography

Film

Television

References

External links

1949 births
Living people
Male actors from Tennessee
African-American male actors
American male film actors
American male television actors
People from Memphis, Tennessee
20th-century American male actors
21st-century American male actors
20th-century African-American people
21st-century African-American people